Bourne 5 may refer to:

 Jason Bourne (film), (2016 film), the fifth film in the film franchise
 The Bourne Betrayal, (2005 novel), by Eric Van Lustbader; fifth novel in the novel series